The Qube is a building in Vancouver, British Columbia, Canada.

It was built as the headquarters for Westcoast Transmission Co. in 1969 and won the 1970–71 Design in Steel Award from the American Iron and Steel Institute. It was known as the Westcoast Transmission Building from 1969 to 2000, Duke Energy Building from 2000 to 2004, and then was renovated to condominiums as the Qube in 2005.

The building was built from the top down. The thirteen-story core was built first then steel was hung from cables at the top and the 9 occupied floors were successively built downwards.

It is considered to be one of Vancouver's most earthquake-resistant structures.

The building's address is 1333 W. Georgia Street. It is located in Vancouver's Coal Harbour, halfway between the main business district in Vancouver's Downtown and Stanley Park.

Cultural references 
The building was used in the television series MacGyver as the headquarters for the fictional Phoenix Foundation, employer of the title character.
It appeared in a similar role in the Highlander series and in Netflix's Altered Carbon as the headquarters of Psychasec.

Gallery

See also 
 List of tallest buildings in Vancouver

References

External links

 Emporis.com  (formerly Skyscrapers.com)
 Janberg's Structurae
 Developer's website
 The fictional Phoenix Foundation at MacGyver Online
 Les & Sonja a page with information from a realtor
 Vancouver Sun February, 05, 2004 article on conversion to condominiums

Buildings and structures in Vancouver
Buildings and structures completed in 1969
MacGyver (1985 TV series)